The North American Saxophone Alliance (NASA) is an organization for saxophone players from around North America.

History 
Following the lead of their colleagues in France, who created the Association of French Saxophonists in 1971, the North American Saxophone Alliance was established in 1976 under the leadership of Frederick Hemke. Since this time, NASA has offered state, regional, and international conferences attracting many important saxophonists to present performances, lectures and master classes, as-well-as found competitions for the next generation of classical and jazz saxophonists. NASA is the largest saxophone organization in the western hemisphere dedicated to the establishment of the saxophone as a medium of serious musical expression.

Members are required to pay dues, which vary depending on age. NASA hosts regional conferences for each of its 10 regions (information below). It also hosts a biennial international conference. The 2014 conference was held at the University of Illinois at Urbana-Champaign on March 20–24, 2014 featuring classical saxophone artists Fred Hemke, Eugene Rousseau, and Don Sinta, as-well-as jazz saxophonists Jeff Coffin, Brad Leali, and Chip McNeil. The 2014 NASA Conference co-hosts are Debra Richtmeyer and J. Michael Holmes.

Past NASA biennial conferences 
 2020: Arizona State University (host: Christopher Creviston)
 2018: University of Cincinnati (host: James Bunte)
 2016: Texas Tech University (host: David Dees)
 2014: University of Illinois at Urbana-Champaign (hosts: Debra Richtmeyer & J. Michael Holmes)
 2012: Arizona State University (host: Timothy McAllister)
 2010: University of Georgia (host: Kenneth/Stephen Fischer)
 2008: University of South Carolina (host: Clifford Leaman)
 2006: University of Iowa (host: Kenneth Tse)
 2004: University of North Carolina (host: Steve Stusek)
 2002: University of North Texas (host: Eric Nestler)
 2000: University of Arizona (host: Kelland Thomas)
 1998: Northwestern University (hosts: Frederick Hemke & Jonathan Helton)
 1996: University of Florida (host: Jonathan Helton)
 1994: West Virginia University (host: David Hastings & Curtis Johnson)

Leadership 
Founding coordinator
 1976–1978: Frederick Hemke

Presidents
 1978–1980: Eugene Rousseau
 1980–1984 Steven Mauk
 1984–1986: Kenneth Fischer
 1986–1988: Ronald Caravan
 1988–1991: Dale Underwood
 1992–1993 William Street
 1994–1996: Michael Jacobson
 1997–1999: Kandace Brooks
 1999–2000: John Sampen
 2001–2002: Paul Bro
 2003–2004: Joseph Lulloff
 2005–2006: Jonathan Helton
 2007–2008: Steven Stusek
 2009–2010: Debra Richtmeyer
 2011–2012: John Nichol
 2013–2014: Clifford Leaman
 2015–2016: Kenneth Tse
 2017–2018: Griffin Campbell
 2019–2020: Christopher Creviston
 2021-2022: Jessica Voigt-Page

Regions 
NASA is divided into eleven regions dividing Canada, the United States of America, and surrounding territories.
 Region 1: Washington, Oregon, Idaho, Montana, Wyoming, Alaska
 Region 2: California, Nevada, Utah, Arizona, Colorado, New Mexico, Hawaii
 Region 3: North Dakota, South Dakota, Nebraska, Minnesota, Iowa
 Region 4: Kansas, Oklahoma, Missouri, Texas, Arkansas
 Region 5: Wisconsin, Illinois, Indiana, Ohio, Michigan
 Region 6: Louisiana, Mississippi, Alabama, Georgia, Florida, Puerto Rico
 Region 7: Kentucky, Tennessee, Virginia, North Carolina, South Carolina, Maryland, Delaware, Washington, D.C.
 Region 8: New York, Pennsylvania, New Jersey, West Virginia, Connecticut, Massachusetts, Rhode Island, Vermont, New Hampshire, Maine
 Region 9: British Columbia, Alberta, Saskatchewan, Manitoba, Yukon, Northwest Territories
 Region 10: Ontario, Quebec, Newfoundland, New Brunswick, Nova Scotia, Prince Edward Island

Publication 
 The Saxophone Symposium is the official magazine of NASA

References 

Saxophone organizations
Music organizations based in the United States
Organizations established in 1976
1976 establishments in the United States